Lady Sings the Blues is an album by American jazz vocalist Billie Holiday released in December 1956. It was Holiday's last album released on Clef Records; the following year, the label would be absorbed by Verve Records. Lady Sings the Blues was taken from sessions taped during 1954 and 1956. It was released simultaneously with her ghostwritten autobiography of the same name.

Content
Taken from sessions taped during 1954–56, Lady Sings the Blues features Holiday backed by tenor saxophonist Paul Quinichette, trumpeter Charlie Shavers, pianist Wynton Kelly, and guitarist Kenny Burrell. Though Holiday's voice had arguably deteriorated by the 1950s, the album is well regarded – in a 1956 review, Down Beat awarded the album 5 out of 5 stars, and had this to say about the co-current book:

Lady Sings The Blues is Billie Holiday's autobiography [...] she tries to get the reader on her side of the mirror, so don't expect a three-dimensional view of the subject. The book was written with William Dufty, assistant to the editor of the New York Post [...] Seldom in the book does she talk about her singing[.]

On November 10, 1956, Holiday appeared in concert at Carnegie Hall in front of a sold-out crowd. The show was planned to commemorate the edition of her autobiography, some paragraphs being read during the performance.

Track listing
Side 1
 "Lady Sings the Blues" (Billie Holiday, Herbie Nichols) - 3:46
 "Trav'lin' Light" (Trummy Young, Jimmy Mundy, Johnny Mercer) - 3:08
 "I Must Have That Man" (Dorothy Fields, Jimmy McHugh) - 3:04
 "Some Other Spring" (Irene Higginbotham, Arthur Herzog, Jr.) - 3:36
 "Strange Fruit" (Lewis Allan) - 3:05
 "No Good Man" (Irene Higginbotham, Sammy Gallop, Dan Fisher) - 3:18
Side 2
"God Bless the Child"  (Billie Holiday, Arthur Herzog, Jr.) - 4:00
"Good Morning Heartache" (Irene Higginbotham, Ervin Drake, Dan Fisher) - 3:28
"Love Me or Leave Me" (Walter Donaldson, Gus Kahn) - 2:38
"Too Marvelous for Words" (Johnny Mercer, Richard Whiting) - 2:16
"Willow Weep for Me" (Ann Ronell) - 3:08
"I Thought About You" (Jimmy Van Heusen, Johnny Mercer) - 2:47

When issued on CD, 3 bonus tracks from the 3 September recording were added:

"P.S. I Love You" (Gordon Jenkins, Johnny Mercer) - 3:36
Softly (Eddie Beal, Joe Greene) - 2:55
Stormy Blues (Billie Holiday) - 3:27

Personnel
June 6 & 7 1956, Fine Sound Studios, New York City (Tracks 1-8)
Billie Holiday, vocals
Paul Quinichette, tenor saxophone
Charlie Shavers, trumpet
Tony Scott, clarinet
Wynton Kelly, piano
Kenny Burrell, guitar
Lenny McBrowne, drums
Aaron Bell, bass

September 3, 1954, Capitol Studios
Billie Holiday, vocals
Willie Smith, alto saxophone
Harry Edison, trumpet
Bobby Tucker, piano
Barney Kessel, guitar
Chico Hamilton, drums
Red Callender, bass

References

External links
https://web.archive.org/web/20120225224251/http://www.billieholidaysongs.com/LP_discography.htm Billie Holiday LP discography
http://www.billieholiday.be/ Billie Holiday songs

1956 albums
Billie Holiday albums
Clef Records albums
Albums produced by Norman Granz